Stuart Sinclair Garson  (December 1, 1898 – May 5, 1977) was a Canadian politician and lawyer. He served as the 12th premier of Manitoba from 1943 to 1948, and later became a Federal cabinet minister.

Life and career
Born in St. Catharines, Ontario, the son of William Garson and Margaret Annable, Garson came to Manitoba with his parents in 1901. He received a Bachelor of Law degree from the University of Manitoba in 1918 and was called to the bar a year later. He practised law in Ashern, Manitoba, from 1919 to 1928. Garson was first elected to the Legislative Assembly of Manitoba for the riding of Fairford in 1927 as a Progressive, defeating incumbent Liberal Albert Kirvan. He defeated again Kirvan in 1932, and faced only minor competition for the remainder of his time in the Manitoba legislature. In early 1932, Garson was one of the founding members of the province's Liberal-Progressive coalition.

Garson was sworn in as provincial Treasurer on September 21, 1936. He also became minister of the Manitoba Power Commission on November 4, 1940, and Minister of Public Utilities on May 15, 1941. He continued to hold all of these positions after succeeding John Bracken as Premier on January 14, 1943. He resigned the MPC and Utilities portfolios in 1944.

Garson's government was perhaps slightly more interventionist than those of Bracken and his eventual successor Douglas Campbell. Garson's ministry began a program of rapid rural electrification, and made some effort to service the needs of returning soldiers after World War II. All the same, he rejected demands from the Manitoba Co-operative Commonwealth Federation to introduce programs in public housing and old-age pensions.

Under Garson's leadership, the "Liberal-Progressive" alliance became a united party—albeit one that was dominated by former Progressive politicians. His ministry also retained close ties to the federal Liberal government of William Lyon Mackenzie King.

Garson moved to federal politics in 1948, at the behest of new Liberal Prime Minister Louis St. Laurent. On November 15, 1948, Garson was sworn in as Minister of Justice and Attorney General; he was elected to the federal parliament in a by-election for the rural seat of Marquette the next month. For the next nine years, Garson would be the dominant cabinet minister from Manitoba in St. Laurent's government. He also served as Solicitor General of Canada from August 7, 1950, to October 14, 1952.

Garson lost his seat in 1957, the year that Progressive Conservative leader John Diefenbaker formed a minority government.  Indeed, Diefenbaker's Tories won victory mainly by ousting many Liberal MPs from the Prairies, including Garson.  He retired from political life. In 1971, he was made a Companion of the Order of Canada.

External links
 
 Stuart Sinclair Garson at The Canadian Encyclopedia
 University of Manitoba profile

1898 births
1977 deaths
Companions of the Order of Canada
Liberal Party of Canada MPs
Lawyers in Manitoba
Canadian King's Counsel
Members of the House of Commons of Canada from Manitoba
Members of the United Church of Canada
Politicians from St. Catharines
Premiers of Manitoba
University of Manitoba alumni
Canadian people of Scottish descent
Solicitors General of Canada
Robson Hall alumni
Finance ministers of Manitoba
Members of the Executive Council of Manitoba